The schooner Exact was the ship that delivered the Denny Party to Alki Point on November 13, 1851, which marked the founding of the city of Seattle.

References

Further reading
 In Search of the Schooner Exact

Schooners of the United States